Emmy DiemerNicolaus (31 January 1910 – 1 January 2008) was a German politician of the Free Democratic Party (FDP) and former member of the German Bundestag.

Life 
Emmy Diemer-Nicolaus was a municipal councillor in Stuttgart from 1946 to 1950. Afterwards she was a member of the state parliament of Württemberg-Baden from 1950 to 1952, and after the merger of Württemberg-Baden, Württemberg-Hohenzollern and Baden from 1952 to 1957 she was a member of the state parliament of Baden-Württemberg. Here she was particularly committed to a liberal constitution for Baden-Württemberg.

In 1957, Diemer-Nicolaus was elected to the German Bundestag via the state list of the FDP in Baden-Württemberg.

Literature

References

1910 births
2008 deaths
Members of the Bundestag for Baden-Württemberg
Members of the Bundestag 1969–1972
Members of the Bundestag 1965–1969
Members of the Bundestag 1961–1965
Members of the Bundestag 1957–1961
Female members of the Bundestag
20th-century German women politicians
Members of the Bundestag for the Free Democratic Party (Germany)
Members of the Landtag of Baden-Württemberg
Members of the Landtag of Württemberg
Commanders Crosses of the Order of Merit of the Federal Republic of Germany
Recipients of the Order of Merit of Baden-Württemberg